Theophilus Tagoe (born 1 May 1982, disappeared 6 July 2014), popularly known as Castro or Castro Under Fire, was a Ghanaian hiplife recording artist and musician.

Early life and career 
He was born in Takoradi in the Western Region of Ghana in 1982 to Lydia Tagoe (a trader) and a Mr. Cofie (an accountant). He had his primary and Junior high education at the All Saints Anglican Primary School in Takoradi. He started singing as early as age 10 and entered the musical scene with his 2003 hit song "Sradenam".  He had features on the hip-life group 4x4 hit track, "Sikletele," which officially introduced him to the local music scene before he launched his debut album in 2003."Sradinam" soon became one of many Ghanaians' favorite hits.

Castro's dream was to retire and become a producer. His dream was to help bring to the limelight talented unknown young artist. He believes that this will develop the young talented artist and groom them for the market by becoming a producer.

Castro was a friend of Ghana national football team's captain, Asamoah Gyan. The duo recorded three albums together. "African Girls" was another hit of theirs.

Disappearance 
On 6 July 2014, Castro and Miss Janet Bandu were reported to have drowned following a jet ski accident in Ada Estuary while on holiday with the Gyan brothers. The jet ski involved in the accident was recovered on the same day of their disappearance but their bodies had not been recovered, despite a search by the police. Little is known of his disappearance.

Recounting events surrounding Castro's disappearance, Gyan said: "That was the first time they went to Aqua Safari and that in the previous years, they went to Akosombo. That particular year, the yacht at Akosombo was broken down so they decided to go to Ada. Before going to Ada, they called to find out if they could get a bigger yacht because, their friends always organised to bring their lady friends so as to make the party fun, so they were told they could get two yachts at Ada. Castro called me a week before I returned to Ghana and said he may not be able to go with us since a friend of his was bereaved, and he had to attend the funeral in Kumasi. A day before we went to Ada, he [Castro] came to my house and said he was on his way to Kumasi and would not join us. But whilst we were on our way to Ada, on the Accra-Tema motorway, we received a phone call that "Under" [Castro] wants us to wait for him. We parked at a fuel filling station where a crowd gathered to catch a glimpse of me. I later got the inclination it was destined to happen because he was initially not part of the trip. When we got to Ada, everything went fine. We were to spend three days. We started using the Jet Ski on the second day.There have been sightings of him in nearby countries, but none of them have been confirmed.May his soul rest in peace

Awards

Ghana Music Awards 
In the year 2006, he won the Hiplife Artiste of the Year as well as the Hiplife Album of the Year, with his song "Toffee". This award won him so much recognition in and outside Ghana.

In the year 2011, he won the Best Hiplife Song of the Year which featured Asamoah Gyan with the song "African Girls".

References 

1982 births
People from Western Region (Ghana)
Missing people
21st-century Ghanaian male singers
21st-century Ghanaian singers
Ghanaian highlife musicians
2010s missing person cases